São Julião may refer to:

People
 São Julião, Portuguese for Saint Julian

Places

Brazil
 São Julião (Piauí), a municipality in the State of Piauí

Portugal
 São Julião (Gouveia), a civil parish in the municipality of Gouveia
 São Julião (Portalegre), a civil parish in the municipality of Portalegre 
 São Julião (Setúbal), a civil parish in the municipality of Setúbal
 São Julião (Valença), a civil parish in the municipality of Valença
 São Julião da Figueira da Foz, a civil parish in the municipality of Figueira da Foz
 São Julião de Montenegro, a civil parish in the municipality of Chaves
 São Julião de Palácios, a civil parish in the municipality of Bragança
 São Julião dos Passos, a civil parish in the municipality of Braga
 São Julião do Tojal, a civil parish in the municipality of Loures